Walter Ray Matthews (October 19, 1934 - April 28, 2014) was a baseball figure who spent 51 years in the Houston Astros organization—at the time, a club record.

Matthews was born in Ashdown, Arkansas. A first baseman and outfielder, he began his professional career in the St. Louis Cardinals organization in 1956 and remained in their system through 1959. He played for the Triple-A Omaha Cardinals in 1959. He joined the Milwaukee Braves system in 1960 (and played briefly at Triple-A again) before signing on with the Jacksonville Jets of the Houston Colt .45s system in 1961. He remained in the Colt .45s/Astros system through 1967—mostly playing at Single A ball—hitting 30 home runs for the Durham Bulls in 1963 (then a club record. In 1966, he managed the Salisbury Astros; in 1967, he skippered the Cocoa Astros. His playing career ended after 1967. Overall, he batted .272 with 137 home runs a 1,134 hits in 1,230 games.

Following his playing and manager career, he became a scout for Houston, signing numerous players including Bill Doran, Johnny Ray and Robbie Wine. He retired in 2012. He died on April 28, 2014, in Ashdown, Arkansas.

References

1934 births
2014 deaths